Saint Prosper may refer to:

Prosper of Aquitaine (c. 390–c. 455), Christian writer and disciple of Saint Augustine of Hippo
Prosper of Reggio (died 466), Italian saint

See also
Prosper (disambiguation)